Glacier Peak is located on the border of Alberta and British Columbia in the Canadian Rockies. It was named in 1894 by Samuel E.S. Allen in reference to the glacier on the northern side of the mountain.

Geology
Glacier Peak is composed of sedimentary rock laid down during the Precambrian to Jurassic periods. Formed in shallow seas, this sedimentary rock was pushed east and over the top of younger rock during the Laramide orogeny.

Climate
Based on the Köppen climate classification, Glacier Peak is located in a subarctic climate zone with cold, snowy winters, and mild summers. Temperatures can drop below −20 °C with wind chill factors below −30 °C.

See also
 List of mountains in the Canadian Rockies
 List of peaks on the British Columbia–Alberta border

References

External links
 Parks Canada web site: Yoho National Park
 Parks Canada web site: Banff National Park

Mountains of Banff National Park
Three-thousanders of Alberta
Three-thousanders of British Columbia
Canadian Rockies